Kleopatra is a non-English spelling of Cleopatra. It may also refer to:

 Kleopatra (singer) (born 1963), a Greek singer 
 216 Kleopatra, a trinary asteroid orbiting in the asteroid belt
 Kleopatra (opera), a Danish-language opera by August Enna 1875
Kleopatra, a 2002 musical by Czech singer Michal David
"Kleopatra", a song by Fergie from Double Dutchess

See also 
 Cleopatra (disambiguation)